Adger is a surname. Notable people with the surname include:

David Adger (born 1967), Scottish linguist
John Bailey Adger (1810–1899), American missionary and preacher
James Adger Smyth (1837–1920), American politician
Neil Adger (born 1964), British geographer
Robert Adger Law (1879–1961), American literary historian